Telecommunications in Taiwan comprise the following communication media, deployed in the Taiwan Area of the Republic of China and regulated by the National Communications Commission of the Executive Yuan.

Since the mid-1970s there has been an accelerating shift from traditional personal services (small shops and restaurants) to modern personal services (department stores and hotels) and modern commercial services (finance and communications).

Domestic television has long carried many foreign programs, and liberalization of import restrictions in the 1980s brought more.

There are about 30 daily newspapers and thousands of periodicals, many of the latter house organs of various political and non-political organizations. The government sets general guidelines for the political and cultural content of newspapers and periodicals. There are three television stations and about 30 radio broadcasting companies with more than 180 stations.

Telephony

Telephones - main lines in use:
16.433 million (2009)

Telephones - mobile cellular:
27.84 million (2009)

Telephone system:
general assessment: provides telecommunication service for every business and private need
domestic: thoroughly modern; completely digitalized
international:
satellite earth stations - 2 Intelsat (1 Pacific Ocean and 1 Indian Ocean); submarine cables to Japan (Okinawa), Philippines, Guam, Singapore, Hong Kong, Indonesia, Australia, Middle East, and Western Europe (1999)
 Fixed network operators: Taiwan Fixed Network, Chunghwa Telecom
 Major cellular operators: Taiwan Mobile, Chunghwa Telecom, FarEasTone, Taiwan Star Telecom, Asia Pacific Telecom (APTG)

The Directorate General of Telecommunications held a monopoly over phone usage until the July 1996 passage of the Telecommunications Act, when the government began permitting private companies to enter the market. When restrictions were relaxed in 1997, seven percent of people had cell phones. By 2000, the rate of coverage increased to 75 percent. Telecommunications companies that began offering services shortly after the Telecommunications Act went into effect included: Far EasTone, Chunghwa Telecom, Tung Jung Telecom and Taiwan Mobile. Tung Jung merged into KG in December 1998, then was bought out by Far EasTone in 2010. Taiwan Mobile acquired Mobitai in 2004, and TransAsia in 2008.

Radio
Radio broadcast stations:
AM 218, FM 333, shortwave 50 (1999)

Radios:
16 million (1994)

Television
Television broadcast stations:
29 (plus two repeaters) (1997)

Televisions:
8.8 million (1998)

Broadcast media:
5 nationwide television networks operating roughly 75 TV stations; about 85% of households utilize multi-channel cable TV; national and regional radio networks with about 170 radio stations (2008)

Internet
See for more: Country code (Top level domain)TW.

Broadband internet access
See for rankings: List of countries by number of broadband Internet subscriptions

The number of broadband subscribers in Taiwan surpassed 4.5 million by the end of March 2007. This number is approximately 20% of the total population.

Internet censorship

There are no government restrictions on access to the Internet or credible reports that the authorities surveil the e-mail or telecommunication chat rooms without appropriate legal authority.

The constitution and law provide for freedom of speech and press, and the government respects these rights in practice. An independent press, an effective judiciary, and a functioning democratic political system combine to protect freedom of speech and press. Individual groups engage in the peaceful expression on views via the Internet, including via the e-mail.

In accordance to a survey conducted by Taiwan's Institute for Information Industry, an NGO, 81.8% of households had Internet access at the end of 2011.

The websites of PRC institutions such as the Chinese Communist Party, People's Daily, and China Central Television can be freely accessed from Taiwan.

However, in April 2019, Mainland Affairs Council deputy minister Chiu Chui-cheng stated that the country was planning to restrict the Chinese video services iQiyi and Tencent Video in the lead-up to the 2020 Taiwan presidential election, fearing that the services could be used to create "cultural and political influences" by the mainland and impact the vote (such as by disseminating pro-mainland propaganda).

See also 
 List of companies of Taiwan
 Censorship in Taiwan
 Media of Taiwan

References

External links 

 Ministry Of Transportation And Communications website
 Press in Taiwan
 http://www.twnic.net.tw/English/Index.htm (Taiwan Network Information Center (TWNIC)

 
Taiwan